Cantharinae is a subfamily of beetles in the family Cantharidae. There are at least 200 described species in Cantharinae.

Taxonomic note
Lawrence and Newton (1995) give the authorship of this subfamily as Imhoff, 1856 (1815).

Tribes and genera
Two tribes are accepted:

Cantharini

 Absidiella Wittmer, 1972
 Ancistronycha Märkel, 1852
 Atalantycha Kazantsev, 2005
 Cantharis Linnaeus, 1758
 Cultellunguis McKey-Fender, 1950
 Cyrtomoptera Motschulsky, 1860
 Hemipodistra Ganglbauer, 1922
 Pacificanthia Kazantsev, 2001
 Pseudoabsidia Wittmer, 1969
 Rhagonycha Eschscholtz, 1830
 Rhaxonycha Motschulsky, 1860
 †Burmomiles Fanti et al. 2018 Burmese amber, Myanmar, Cenomanian
 †Elektrokleinia Ellenberger & Fanti, 2019 Burmese amber Myanmar, Cenomanian
 †Myamalycocerus Fanti and Ellenberger 2016 Burmese amber, Myanmar, Cenomanian
 †Molliberus Peris and Fanti 2018 Spanish amber, Albian
 †Ornatomalthinus Poinar and Fanti 2016 Burmese amber, Myanmar, Cenomanian (Subsequently suggested to belong to Silinae)
 †Sanaungulus Fanti et al. 2018 Burmese amber, Myanmar, Cenomanian

Podabrini
Auth.: Gistel, 1856

 Asiopodabrus Wittmer, 1982
 Cephalomalthinus Pic, 1921
 Dichelotarsus Motschulsky, 1859
 Falsopodabrus Pic, 1927
 Fissopodabrus Pic, 1927
 Hatchiana Fender, 1966
 Kandyosilis Pic, 1929
 Micropodabrus Pic, 1920
 Podabrus Westwood, 1838
 Stenopodabrus Nakane, 1992

†Cacomorphocerini
Auth: Fanti and Kupryjanowicz 2018, all known members originate from the Eocene aged Baltic amber
 †Cacomorphocerus Schaufuss 1891
 †Eridanula Fanti and Damgaard 2018
 †Noergaardia Fanti and Damgaard 2018
 †Sucinocantharis Kuśka and Kania 2010
 †Sucinorhagonycha Kuska 1996

Incertae sedis
†Katyacantharis Kazantsev and Perkovsky 2019, Agdzhakend amber, Azerbaijan, Cenomanian

References

 Bouchard, P., Y. Bousquet, A. Davies, M. Alonso-Zarazaga, J. Lawrence, C. Lyal, A. Newton, et al. (2011). "Family-group names in Coleoptera (Insecta)". ZooKeys, vol. 88, 1–972.
 Lawrence, J. F., and A. F. Newton Jr. / Pakaluk, James, and Stanislaw Adam Slipinski, eds. (1995). "Families and subfamilies of Coleoptera (with selected genera, notes, references and data on family-group names)". Biology, Phylogeny, and Classification of Coleoptera: Papers Celebrating the 80th Birthday of Roy A. Crowson, vol. 2, 779–1006.
 Ramsdale, Alistair S. / Arnett, Ross H. Jr., M. C. Thomas, P. E. Skelley, and J. H. Frank, eds. (2002). "Family 64. Cantharidae". American Beetles, volume 2: Polyphaga: Scarabaeoidea through Curculionoidea, 202–218.

Further reading

 NCBI Taxonomy Browser, Cantharinae
 Arnett, R.H. Jr., M. C. Thomas, P. E. Skelley and J. H. Frank. (eds.). (2002). American Beetles, Volume II: Polyphaga: Scarabaeoidea through Curculionoidea. CRC Press LLC, Boca Raton, FL.
 Arnett, Ross H. (2000). American Insects: A Handbook of the Insects of America North of Mexico. CRC Press.
 Richard E. White. (1983). Peterson Field Guides: Beetles. Houghton Mifflin Company.

Cantharidae